Ophryotrocha is a genus of marine polychaete worms in the family Dorvilleidae.

Species
The World Register of Marine Species lists the following species in the genus :

Ophryotrocha adherens Paavo, Bailey-Brock & Akesson, 2000
Ophryotrocha akessoni Blake, 1985
Ophryotrocha alborana Paxton & Åkesson, 2011
Ophryotrocha antarctica Szaniawski & Wrona, 1987
Ophryotrocha atlantica Hilbig & Blake, 1991
Ophryotrocha baccii Parenti, 1961
Ophryotrocha batillus Wiklund et al., 2012
Ophryotrocha bifida Hilbig & Blake, 1991
Ophryotrocha birgittae Paxton & Åkesson, 2011
Ophryotrocha cantabrica Núñez, Riera & Maggio, 2014
Ophryotrocha claparedei Studer, 1878
Ophryotrocha clava Taboada, Wiklund, Glover, Dahlgren, Cristobo & Avila, 2013
Ophryotrocha cosmetandra Oug, 1990
Ophryotrocha costlowi Paxton & Åkesson, 2010
Ophryotrocha craigsmithi Wiklund, Glover & Dahlgren, 2009
Ophryotrocha cyclops Salvo, Wiklund, Dufour, Hamoutene, Pohle & Worsaae, 2014
Ophryotrocha diadema Åkesson, 1976
Ophryotrocha dimorphica Zavarzina & Tsetlin, 1986
Ophryotrocha dubia Hartmann-Schröder, 1974
Ophryotrocha eutrophila Wiklund, Glover & Dahlgren, 2009
Ophryotrocha fabriae Paxton & Morineaux, 2009
Ophryotrocha flabella Wiklund et al., 2012
Ophryotrocha gerlachi Hartmann-Schröder, 1974
Ophryotrocha geryonicola (Esmark, 1878)
Ophryotrocha globopalpata Blake & Hilbig, 1990
Ophryotrocha gracilis Huth, 1933
Ophryotrocha hadalis Jumars, 1974
Ophryotrocha hartmanni Huth, 1933
Ophryotrocha irinae Tsetlin, 1980
Ophryotrocha japonica Paxton & Åkesson, 2010
Ophryotrocha jiaolongi Zhang, Zhou, Wang & Rouse, 2017
Ophryotrocha kagoshimaensis Miura, 1997
Ophryotrocha labidion Hilbig & Blake, 1991
Ophryotrocha labronica Bacci & La Greca, 1961
Ophryotrocha langstrumpae Wiklund et al., 2012
Ophryotrocha lipovskyae (Paxton, 2009)
Ophryotrocha lipscombae Lu & Fauchald, 2000
Ophryotrocha littoralis (Levinsen, 1879)
Ophryotrocha lobifera Oug, 1978
Ophryotrocha longicollaris Wiklund et al., 2012
Ophryotrocha longidentata Josefson, 1975
Ophryotrocha lukowensis Szaniawski, 1974
Ophryotrocha lusa Ravara, Marçal, Wiklund & Hilário, 2015
Ophryotrocha maciolekae Hilbig & Blake, 1991
Ophryotrocha macrovifera Paxton & Åkesson, 2010
Ophryotrocha maculata Åkesson, 1973
Ophryotrocha magnadentata Wiklund et al., 2012
Ophryotrocha mammillata Ravara, Marçal, Wiklund & Hilário, 2015
Ophryotrocha mandibulata Hilbig & Blake, 1991
Ophryotrocha mediterranea Martin, Abello & Cartes, 1991
Ophryotrocha minuta Levi, 1954
Ophryotrocha natans Pfannenstiel, 1975
Ophryotrocha nauarchus Wiklund et al., 2012
Ophryotrocha notialis (Ehlers, 1908)
Ophryotrocha notoglandulata Pfannenstiel, 1972
Ophryotrocha obtusa Hilbig & Blake, 1991
Ophryotrocha orensanzi Taboada, Wiklund, Glover, Dahlgren, Cristobo & Avila, 2013
Ophryotrocha pachysoma Hilbig & Blake, 1991
Ophryotrocha paragerlachi Brito & Nunez, 2003
Ophryotrocha paralabidion Hilbig & Blake, 1991
Ophryotrocha permanae Paxton & Åkesson, 2010
Ophryotrocha platykephale Blake, 1985
Ophryotrocha puerilis Claparède & Mecznikow, 1869
Ophryotrocha robusta Paxton & Åkesson, 2010
Ophryotrocha rubra Paxton & Åkesson, 2010
Ophryotrocha sadina Ravara, Marçal, Wiklund & Hilário, 2015
Ophryotrocha scarlatoi Averincev, 1989
Ophryotrocha schubravyi Tsetlin, 1980
Ophryotrocha scutellus Wiklund, Glover & Dahlgren, 2009
Ophryotrocha shieldsi Paxton & Davey, 2010
Ophryotrocha socialis Ockelmann & Akesson, 1990
Ophryotrocha spatula Fournier & Conlan, 1994
Ophryotrocha splendida Brito & Nunez, 2003
Ophryotrocha vellae Paxton & Åkesson, 2010
Ophryotrocha vivipara Banse, 1963
Ophryotrocha wubaolingi Miura, 1997

References

Polychaetes